S.C. Faetano is a Sanmarinese football club, based in Faetano. The club was founded in 1962. Faetano currently plays in Campionato Sammarinese di Calcio, the only football league of San Marino. The team's colours are white and blue.

Achievements 
Campionato Sammarinese di Calcio: 3
 1985–86, 1990–91, 1998–99
Coppa Titano: 3
 1993, 1994, 1998
San Marino Federal Trophy: 1
 1994

European record

Current squad

External links 
FSGC page
eufo.de – Team Squad

Association football clubs established in 1962
Football clubs in San Marino
Former Italian football clubs
1962 establishments in San Marino
Faetano